Luis Norberto Tirado Gordillo (born 4 April 1906 — 24 November 1964) was a Chilean footballer and manager.

Career
Born in Copiapó, Chile, he represented the Tocopilla team at the age of 14. Later, he played for Colo-Colo, Santiago National, Magallanes and Universidad de Chile.

He coached three Chile national teams and Universidad de Chile as well as Colo-Colo two times. Outside of Chile, he coached Sporting Cristal from 1956 to 1958.

Personal life
In 1926, he graduated as a primary school teacher. In addition, he spent time making conferences and sport talks.

At the same time he was a player of Universidad de Chile, he studied to graduate as a PE teacher.

Honours

Manager 
Universidad de Chile
 Primera División de Chile (1): 1940

Colo-Colo
 Primera División de Chile (1): 1945

Sporting Cristal
 Primera División de Peru (1): 1956

San Luis de Quillota
 Segunda División de Chile (1): 1958

References

External links
 Luis Tirado at PartidosdeLaRoja 

1906 births
1964 deaths
People from Copiapó
Chilean footballers
Colo-Colo footballers
Santiago National F.C. players
Deportes Magallanes footballers
Magallanes footballers
Universidad de Chile footballers
Chilean Primera División players
Association football midfielders
Chilean football managers
Magallanes managers
Unión Española managers
Universidad de Chile managers
Colo-Colo managers
Chile national football team managers
Club Deportivo Palestino managers
Sporting Cristal managers
San Luis de Quillota managers
Audax Italiano managers
Deportes Temuco managers
Unión San Felipe managers
Chilean Primera División managers
Peruvian Primera División managers
Primera B de Chile managers
Chilean expatriate football managers
Chilean expatriate sportspeople in Peru
Expatriate football managers in Peru